Edward Lane may refer to:

 Edward Lane (1584–1650), alias for Richard Lane, Chief Baron of the Exchequer
 Edward William Lane (1801–1876), British Orientalist, translator and lexicographer
 Edward Lane (Illinois politician) (1842–1912), American lawyer, judge and U.S. Representative from Illinois
 Edward Lane (footballer) (born 1908), English footballer
 Edward E. Lane (1924–2009), Virginia lawyer and politician